Massachusetts Senate's 1st Middlesex and Norfolk district in the United States is one of 40 legislative districts of the Massachusetts Senate. It covers 5.7% of Middlesex County and 11.3% of Norfolk County population. Democrat Cindy Creem of Newton has represented the district since 1999.

Locales represented
The district includes the following localities:
 Brookline
 Newton
 part of Wellesley

The current district geographic boundary overlaps with those of the Massachusetts House of Representatives' 10th Middlesex, 11th Middlesex, 12th Middlesex, 14th Norfolk, 15th Norfolk, 10th Suffolk, 15th Suffolk, and 18th Suffolk districts.

Senators 
 Edward Lawrence Burke, 1974-1987 
 Lois Pines
 Cynthia Stone Creem, 1999-current

See also
 List of Massachusetts Senate elections
 List of Massachusetts General Courts
 List of former districts of the Massachusetts Senate
 Middlesex County districts of the Massachusetts House of Representatives: 1st, 2nd, 3rd, 4th, 5th, 6th, 7th, 8th, 9th, 10th, 11th, 12th, 13th, 14th, 15th, 16th, 17th, 18th, 19th, 20th, 21st, 22nd, 23rd, 24th, 25th, 26th, 27th, 28th, 29th, 30th, 31st, 32nd, 33rd, 34th, 35th, 36th, 37th
 Norfolk County districts of the Massachusetts House of Representatives: 1st, 2nd, 3rd, 4th, 5th, 6th, 7th, 8th, 9th, 10th, 11th, 12th, 13th, 14th, 15th

References

External links
 Ballotpedia
  (State Senate district information based on U.S. Census Bureau's American Community Survey).
 League of Women Voters of Newton

Senate
Government of Middlesex County, Massachusetts
Government of Norfolk County, Massachusetts
Massachusetts Senate